Lapa is a neighborhood in the city of Rio de Janeiro, in Brazil. It is located in the centre of Rio and is famous for its historical monuments and nightlife.

The neighborhood is home to the Arcos da Lapa, an impressive aqueduct constructed in the mid-18th century by colonial authorities. Another important historical attraction is the Passeio Público, the first public park of the city, built in the 1780s.

Since the early 1950s, Lapa has been known for its lively cultural life where there is a concentration of many restaurants and bars where Brazilian artists and intellectuals would meet. It was, and still is, famous for its many restaurants, bars and clubs where the various forms of Brazilian music can be appreciated, like the Asa Branca bar and the Fundição Progresso. The Sala Cecília Meireles, an important venue for chamber music, is also located in Lapa.

Arcos da Lapa

The neighborhood of Lapa, Rio de Janeiro, known as the cradle of bohemian Rio is also famous for its architecture, starting with the Arcos – known as the Arcos da Lapa, constructed to act as conduit in the days of colonial Brazil and now serve as a signal for the cable cars that climb the hill of Santa Teresa.

The Carioca Aqueduct is considered the architectural work of greater importance of Old Rio and one of the main symbols of the city. The impressive Roman-style building is 17.6 meters high, 270 meters long and 42 arches that connect the neighborhood of Santa Teresa to Morro de Santo Antônio. The Carioca Aqueduct was built in 1723, during the colonial Brazil, and was intended to lead water from the Carioca river height Morro do Desterro, on Santa Teresa for the Morro de Santo Antônio. The work would help solve the problem of water shortage in the city. Problem that was already old. Studies to bring the waters of the Carioca river to the city began in the early years of the seventeenth century, but the works of installing water pipes in Rio de Janeiro did not start until a century later.

In recent times the landscape of Lapa has been significantly amended. Where was the Square of the Brazilian armed forces (a square attached to the arches) today there is a huge Circo Voador. Arches Street, which crosses the aqueduct, was via a building occupied by trees, including the Progress Casting, which is now a venue. The neighborhood is born at the end of the south, where the road of glory becomes Rua da Lapa. Also on the border of Santa Teresa, climbing its slopes and the small neighborhood of Fátima.

In an attempt to rescue the vocation of the residential district was created the Movement "I am from Lapa". Inspired by the famous advertising campaign "I love NY", who helped revitalize the American city that was in decline in the 1970s, the movement seeks to rescue the pride of saying "I'm from Lapa ". With government support and participation of the majority of shops in Lapa, the "I am from Lapa" was spread around town, but with few effective achievements in the area of security, rehabilitation of the homeless and combating crime, old complaints from residents public authorities.

With the population density in other regions of the city and increased traffic, the neighborhood, which holds the headquarters and administrative buildings for many large companies (Petrobras, BNDES, etc..) As well as numerous commercial buildings of high standard on Chile Avenue (Ventura I and II, etc..), has also attracted the attention of residents of the north, south and west of Rio de Janeiro, eager to live close to work, downtown, escaping from traffic jams. Therefore, newly launched residential projects providing comprehensive infrastructure or structure apart-hotel (Viva Lapa, Cores da Lapa, etc..) Have exhausted their sales in full release, which clearly shows the pent-up demand for housing in standard high in the neighborhood.

Culture

Reference point for lovers of nightlife, one of the striking features of the neighborhood is the harmony that living with the most diverse urban tribes. Since the 1950s, when it began to be called the "Montmartre Carioca", Lapa attracted intellectuals, artists, politicians and especially the people of Rio, who come together to celebrate the samba, forró, MPB (música popular brasileira), choro and more recently, electronic music and rock.

For the major pathways, Mem de Sá, Rua do Riachuelo Street and Lavradio, spread attractions such as the Sala Cecilia Meireles, who is considered one of the best concert of chamber music existing in Rio.

The Public Promenade, the National School of Music, the Church of Our Lady of Lapa do Desterro and the Escadaria Selarón are references to the tourist who wants to see a sample of the architecture of old Rio.

Music 
As highlights of the night, there are the famous Asa Branca, the main stronghold of forró, bars Seed, where there have been artists such as Teresa and the group Casuarina, Ernesto, Coffee Cultural Sacrilege beyond the River and Scenarium Carioca da Gema, where absolute reign wheels samba. Recently opened the gaff Lapa 40 Graus, in Brook Street next to the traditional Democratic Club, which had space for the dance, the samba, choro and gaff. 
For the public that prefers electronic music and rock concerts, there is the Progress and Casting Flying Circus, opened in 2004. There is also a plethora of bars and venues that cater to all tastes.

References
Official touritic site of Rio de Janeiro city

External links
Photo Tour of Lapa, Rio de Janeiro
Lapa Map and Attractions

Neighbourhoods in Rio de Janeiro (city)
Entertainment districts in Brazil
Restaurant districts and streets in Brazil